Daniel O'Rourke (or Dan or Danny) may refer to:

 Daniel O'Rourke (horse) (1849–?), British Thoroughbred racehorse and sire
 Daniel O'Rourke (politician) (died 1968), Irish politician and teacher
 Dan O'Rourke (ice hockey) (born 1972), ice hockey referee
 Daniel O'Rourke, a book by Thomas Crofton Croker
 Danny O'Rourke (soccer) (born 1983), American soccer player

Orourke, Daniel